Zerlina (minor planet designation: 531 Zerlina), provisional designation 1904 NW, carbonaceous Palladian asteroid from the central region of the asteroid belt, approximately 18 kilometers in diameter. It was discovered by German astronomer Max Wolf at the Heidelberg-Königstuhl State Observatory on 12 April 1904.

Orbit and characteristics 

Observations using the IRAS satellite have shown it to have an absolute magnitude of 11.8, a diameter of 15.19 kilometers, a rotational period of 16.706 hours, and an albedo of 0.1460.

Naming 

It is named for a character in Mozart's opera, Don Giovanni ).

References

External links 
 Asteroid Lightcurve Database (LCDB), query form (info )
 Dictionary of Minor Planet Names, Google books
 Asteroids and comets rotation curves, CdR – Observatoire de Genève, Raoul Behrend
 Discovery Circumstances: Numbered Minor Planets (1)-(5000) – Minor Planet Center
 
 

000531
Discoveries by Max Wolf
Named minor planets
531 Zerlina
000531
19040412